Pebble House, Vol. 1: Kuwaderno is the second studio album by Filipino indie folk/folk pop band Ben&Ben. It features 12 tracks written in Filipino, including six collaborations with other Filipino artists. The album was released on 29 August 2021 under Sony Music Philippines. All tracks in this album were included on Spotify's Top 200 chart in three days, seven of which were included on the Top 100 charts of the same music streaming platform.

Background
In April 2021, a few months after topping Spotify's list of most streamed artists in the Philippines, Ben&Ben announced that they would take a break from live performances and start recording their second album. Ben&Ben announced on social media that they will be releasing their second album on 29 August 2021. The album was then announced as being titled Pebble House, Vol. 1: Kuwaderno.

Collaborations
Ben&Ben announced on social media that they will be collaborating with 6 other OPM artists for their second album.

On 28 July 2021, it was announced that Moira Dela Torre was the first collaborator of the album. It is the second time Ben&Ben collaborated with dela Torre after "Paalam," a song featured in Moira's album "Patawad."

More than a week later, via Twitter spaces, it was revealed that Munimuni were the second collaborators of the album.

On 17 August 2021, through Facebook live, it was revealed that Chito Miranda, the lead singer-songwriter for the band Parokya ni Edgar, was the third collaborator of the album.

Two days later, it was revealed that Juan Karlos Labajo and Zild Benitez were the fourth collaborators of the album.

On 22 August 2021, a week before the release of the album, it was announced that KZ Tandingan was the fifth collaborator of the album.

A day after, it was revealed that SB19 were the final collaborators of the album. It is the second time Ben&Ben collaborated with SB19 after "Mapa (Band Version)," a rendition from SB19's digital single.

Singles
The first single "Upuan" was released on 7 May 2021. Paolo and Miguel shared that they started writing the song in a hotel room in Dumaguete while they were on tour for their debut album.

A week later, the second single "Magpahinga" was released. Ben&Ben revealed that the song was dedicated to the victims of COVID-19. Paolo shared that the song was written when their sister got the disease.

The third single "Pasalubong" was released on 29 July 2021, more than two months after releasing the second single. In collaboration with fellow Filipino artist Moira Dela Torre, the song is inspired by its double meaning, which refers to gifts presented by homecomers, and could also mean "to meet."

A couple of weeks later, the fourth single titled "Sugat" was released. Written by the band's percussionist Toni Muñoz and vocalist Paolo Guico, in collaboration with fellow indie folk band Munimuni, "Sugat" is a song that reflects on healing after facing the emptiness of loss.

Over two months since the album's release, "Lunod" was released as its fifth single. As part of Pebble House’s track list in collaboration with Zild Benitez and Juan Karlos Labajo (who, both in the album and single, are credited as Zild and juan karlos respectively), "Lunod" takes on a rock opera-esque reflection on mental health.

Track listing
All songs were written by Paolo Guico and Miguel Guico except where noted.

Personnel
 Miguel Benjamin Guico – lead vocals, acoustic guitar
 Paolo Benjamin Guico – lead vocals, acoustic guitar
 Poch Barretto – lead guitar, backing vocals ("Sugat")
 Jam Villanueva – drums
 Agnes Reoma – bass
 Patricia Lasaten – keyboards
 Toni Muñoz – percussion, lead vocals ("Sugat", "Sabel", "Ilang Tulog Na Lang"), backing vocals ("Pasalubong")
 Andrew de Pano – percussion, backing vocals
 Keifer Cabugao – violin, backing vocals

Additional personnel
 Chito Miranda - co-lead vocals ("Swimming Pool")
 Moira Dela Torre - co-lead vocals ("Pasalubong")
 Zild and Juan Karlos - co-lead vocals ("Lunod")
 KZ Tandingan - co-lead vocals ("Sabel")
 SB19 - co-lead vocals ("Kapangyarihan")
 Munimuni - co-lead vocals ("Sugat")
 Manila String Machine - violin instrumentals ("Elyu")
 Karen Dela Fuente, Karelle Bulan, and Isobel Funk - creative directors
 Jean-Paul Verona - producer
 Sam Marquez - co-producer
 Leon Zervos - mastering

Accolades

References

External links

2021 albums
Ben&Ben albums